Kangavar (Kangâvar; also Romanized as Kangāvar) is a city and capital of Kangavar County, Kermanshah Province, Iran. At the 2006 census, its population was 48,901, with 12,220 families. 

Kangavar is located in the easternmost part of Kermanshah Province, on the modern road from Hamadan to Kermanshah, identical with a trace of the Silk Road, located at the distance of about 75 km from Hamadan and 96 km from Kermanshah.

History 
Kangavar was mentioned by Isidore of Charax in the 1st century AD, by the name of "Konkobar" or "Concobar" in the ancient province of Ecbatana (modern Hamedan). In antiquity, the city was in Media, with a temple of Artemis (Isidor. Char. p. 7; Tab. Pent.; Geogr. Rav.)

In the early 20th century, Kangāvar was held in fief by the family of a deceased court official, forming a separate government.

Today, the town is best known for the archaeological remains of a mixed Sassanid and Achaemenid-style edifice. During the 19th century and the beginning of the 20th century, the ruins were misused as a source for building material for the expanding town. Excavation first began in 1968, by which time the "large structure with its great columns set on a high stone platform" had been associated with a comment by Isidore of Charax, that refers to a "temple of Artemis" (Parthian Stations 6) at "Concobar" in Lower Media, on the overland trade route between the Levant and India. References to Artemis in Iran are generally interpreted to be references to Anahita, and thus Isidore's "temple of Artemis" came to be understood as a reference to a temple of Anahita.

Although a general plan of the complex has been compiled, it is still not sufficient to learn about the function and shape of the terrace and the buildings that stood there. Given the lack of archaeological evidence for a temple-like building, "it is questionable whether the [temple noted by Isodore] is identical with the ruins of Kangāvar. Isidorus described obviously another temple of the first century AD, somewhere in the region of Congobar (Kangāvar) or at the place of the later platform, which, according to the results of the excavation, seems to be built up in Sasanian times."

References

Bibliography

  
  
  
  

Populated places in Kangavar County
Cities in Kermanshah Province
Sasanian cities
Kurdish settlements in Kermanshah Province